Jigar Kumar Hakumatrai Naik (born 10 August 1984) is an English cricket player. Jigar was both at Leicester and educated at Rushey Mead School and  Gateway College in the city.  He is, as of June 2015, playing for Leicestershire.

Naik who played for Kibworth and Billesdon as well as Loughborough MCCU, made history when he became the first Leicester-born Asian to play for Leicestershire in a first-class game against a touring West Indies A side. Naik took one wicket, that of test batsmen Dwayne Smith.

In Naik's first county game against Glamorgan in the Pro40, he took 3/24.

Naik has been a consistsent performer since 2009. In 2009 he was named Leicestershire's most improved uncapped player. In 2010, Naik topped the national bowling averages with 35 wickets at an average of 17.59, including 7–96 against Surrey at The Oval. A lot of credit for this has to go to his spin partner at Leics, Claude Henderson. Both received new 2-year contracts at the end of the 2011 season.

Naik missed a large part of the 2012 season when he damaged ankle ligaments in early May, not making a comeback until August.

Naik did make an excellent start to the 2013 season when he took 5–98 against Worcestershire in early May. His season came to a premature end when he dislocated a shoulder against Nottinghamshire on 12 July.

References

External links

1984 births
Living people
Leicestershire cricketers
Cricketers from Leicester
English cricketers
Loughborough MCCU cricketers
Leicestershire Cricket Board cricketers
Dorset cricketers
Dorset cricket captains
British sportspeople of Indian descent
British Asian cricketers